Doomsday Clock is a 2017–2019 superhero comic book limited series published by DC Comics, written by Geoff Johns with art by penciller Gary Frank and colorist Brad Anderson. The series concludes the story established in The New 52 and DC Rebirth, and is a direct sequel to the graphic novel Watchmen by Alan Moore, Dave Gibbons and John Higgins.

Although then-DC co-publisher Dan DiDio confirmed that Doomsday Clock is a sequel to Watchmen, Johns originally declined to characterize it as such, viewing it as a standalone story.

The series's debut issue was published on November 22, 2017, and the final issue was published on December 18, 2019.

Publication history
Doomsday Clock is part of the DC Rebirth initiative, and it continues the narrative that was established with the 2016 one-shot DC Universe: Rebirth Special, the 2017 crossover event "The Button" and other related stories. It is a follow-up to the 1986–1987 miniseries Watchmen by Alan Moore, Dave Gibbons and John Higgins, and it introduces that story's characters into the DC Universe, alongside a few original characters created for the book. Although Dan DiDio (then DC's co-publisher) confirmed that it is a sequel to that miniseries, Johns  originally declined to characterize it as such, viewing it as a standalone story, saying, "It is something else. It is Watchmen colliding with the DC Universe."

Doomsday Clock was revealed on May 14, 2017, with a teaser image displaying the Superman logo in the 12 o'clock slot of the clock depicted in Watchmen and the series title in the bold typeface used for Watchmen.

The story includes many characters, but has a particular focus on Superman and Doctor Manhattan. Johns felt like there was an interesting story to be told in DC Rebirth with Doctor Manhattan; he thought there was an interesting dichotomy between Superman—an alien who embodies and is compassionate for humanity—and Doctor Manhattan—a human who has detached himself from humanity. This idea led to over six months of debates amongst the creative team about whether or not to intersect the Watchmen universe with the DC Universe. He explained that Doomsday Clock was the "most personal and most epic, utterly mind-bending project" that he had worked on in his career.

Johns also explained that Doomsday Clock is a stand-alone story with no tie-in material. However, it "will have an impact on the entire DC Universe. It will affect everything moving forward and everything that has come before. It will touch the thematic and literal essence of DC." So by the time the final issue is released, "the rest of the universe will have caught up to it — and the repercussions of the event will become known."

Release schedules
The first issue of Doomsday Clock was released on November 22, 2017, with a planned run of 12 issues. The series was originally scheduled to release monthly and end in December 2018, with planned breaks in March and August 2018. However, in January 2018, it was announced that the series would take a break in March and April 2018, before releasing again in May 2018 and switching to a bi-monthly schedule, with the series ending in July 2019. Issue #8 was pushed back from November 28 to December 5, 2018. Issue #9 was pushed back from January 23 to March 6, 2019. Issue #10 was pushed back from March 27 to May 29, 2019. Issue #11 was pushed back from May 22 to September 4, 2019. The twelfth and final issue was published on December 18, 2019.

Two collected editions of six issues each were released in October 2019 and June 2020. A single-volume edition of all 12 issues followed in October 2020. An Absolute Edition collecting the full series and extra bonus material was released in October, 2022.

Setting

Plot
Doomsday Clock is the finale of the story that was established in DC Rebirth, officially concluding the storylines that began in The New 52 continuity. The comic features the concept of the Multiverse, where the Watchmen universe exists separately from the DC Universe and each universe's characters treat the other universe's characters as fictional.

In the Watchmen universe, seven years after the massacre in New York City, the details inside Rorschach's journal have been published, exposing Ozymandias's role in the event. Now a fugitive, Ozymandias gathers several others to find Doctor Manhattan and bring him back to save the world.

Meanwhile, in the DC Universe, during the present day, the "Supermen Theory", a conspiracy theory that accuses the federal government of the United States of creating its own metahumans, has created international conflict and led to an arms race, with various governments around the world recruiting metahumans and creating sanctioned superteams.

As characters from both universes meet each other, most of them try to find Manhattan for many different reasons, leading them to encounter mysteries and receive revelations they have not been aware of.

Characters

Doomsday Clock features characters from Watchmen and the DC Universe, and also introduces some new characters, such as Reggie Long, the son of Malcolm Long, who becomes the new Rorschach; Mime and Marionette, a married couple of criminals searching for their missing son; and Bubastis II, a clone of the original Bubastis.

Other returning characters include the Comedian, Doctor Manhattan, Mothman and Ozymandias, alongside Alfred Pennyworth, Batman, Black Adam, Firestorm, Johnny Thunder, Joker, Lex Luthor, Lois Lane, Pozhar, Saturn Girl, Superman and Wonder Woman.

Issues

Reception
Doomsday Clock received acclaim from critics. On the review aggregator Comic Book Roundup, it holds an average rating of 8.5 out of 10 from professional critics, based on 438 reviews.

Aftermath and sequel
Following the release of the final issue, Geoff Johns stated that he and Gary Frank were considering the possibility of a sequel for Doomsday Clock.

The series is referenced in the DC Universe afterward:

 Dark Nights: Death Metal (2020)
 Generations (2020)
 Infinite Frontier relaunch (2021)
 Flashpoint Beyond (2022)
 The New Golden Age (2022)

Collected editions

References

Comics about parallel universes
Comics about time travel
Comics by Geoff Johns
Crossover comics
DC Comics storylines
Watchmen